Streptomyces durmitorensis is a bacterium species from the genus of Streptomyces which has been isolated from soil from the Durmitor National Park in Serbia and Montenegro.

See also 
 List of Streptomyces species

References

Further reading

External links
Type strain of Streptomyces durmitorensis at BacDive -  the Bacterial Diversity Metadatabase

durmitorensis
Bacteria described in 2007